Aval is a 1967 Malayalam film directed by P. M. A. Azeez with Madhu, K. P. Ummer, Adoor Bhasi, Kaduvakulam Antony, Kedamangalam Ali, Krishnankutty, Maya, Meenakumari, Kozhikode Santha Devi and Ushanandini in the star cast. The film is about sexual impotence, divorce and a social system riddled with incestuous relationships. It was the first Malayalam film to be directed by a Film Institute graduate. It also marked the debut of cinematographer Mankada Ravi Varma.

Cast
Madhu
Adoor Bhasi
Maya
K. P. Ummer
Kaduvakulam Antony
Kedamangalam Ali
Meena
Santha Devi
Ushanandini
Krishnankutty

Soundtrack
The music was composed by G. Devarajan and the lyrics were written by Vayalar Ramavarma.

References

External links

 Aval at the Malayalam Movie Database

1960s Malayalam-language films
1967 directorial debut films
1967 films